This is a list of people affiliated with the Indian Institute of Technology Kanpur.

Notable faculty

Notable alumni

Business

Politics and civil services

Science and technology

Teaching

References

Indian Institutes of Technology people
IIT Kanpur
Indian Institute of Technology Kanpur
People by university or college in Uttar Pradesh